Sunbury Manor School is a secondary academy school in Sunbury-on-Thames, in Surrey, England.

Admissions
The school educates an overwhelmingly number of  children within its catchment area. Pupils are between 11 and 16 year old (i.e. in school years 7 to 11). The headteacher is Ms.Michelle Prentice. The school is conjoined with Sunbury Leisure Centre and makes use of the centre's resources.  Sunbury Manor has been designated a Specialist Humanities College, with specialisms in English, History and Geography.

Location
The school is a few hundred metres south-west of junction one of the M3; the same, south, of the Shepperton Branch Line, with pavements to Upper Halliford and Sunbury stations; and somewhat less, west, of the 216 and 235 bus routes.

History

Site dedication to public and charitable use
This site was a quite productive smallholding (in medieval times of the locally great manor fields) in which sat a rather large house by the 1870s. In 1881 this house, as Mount Pleasant, which had earlier been a private school, was bought by the Good Templars and Temperance (educational) Orphanage - a time in the height of Victorian Britain when purchase by a broad range of well-benefacted charities became possible. It took earlier premises in 1874 for the children of total abstainers of alcohol. It educated usually about 30-40 pupils. The site was to be named (by 1894 and thereafter) Marion Park, featuring a long rectangular pond to its east. The orphanage became conspicuously under-used after the passage of de-institutionalising legislation, discouraging institutions in favour of foster care in the United Kingdom and adoption, in the early 20th century; given how local population and housing had grown as industry and commuting expanded.  Those children and warders/carers who remained were evacuated during World War II and was afterwards moved elsewhere. The county council bought the property in 1952 and transformed the site via a new set of buildings into a conventional school.

Previous school governing regimes
The school is indirect successor to the Sunbury County Grammar School, which opened in 1956 on the site with 150 boys and girls, administered by Middlesex County Council Educational Committee then (from 1965) the Northern Surrey Divisional Executive of Surrey Education Committee. The intermediate existence was as Sunbury County Secondary School, which accepted ages 12–16.

Facilities
Building A
Main School Hall
8 English Classrooms
8 Mathematics Classrooms
8 Science Laboratories
Learning Resource Area with Physiotherapy Room

Building B
Sunbury Leisure Centre - Dance Studio, Sports Hall, Swimming Pool

Building C
Dining Room
4 Modern Foreign Language Classrooms
1 Business Studies Classroom

Building D
5 Computer Suites
1 PE Classroom
1 Drama Classroom
Learning Resource Centre
Sports Hall

Building E
2 D&T Graphics Classrooms
2 Workshops
2 Food & Nutrition Classrooms

Building F
8 Humanities Classrooms

Building G
3 Art Classrooms
1 Photography Classroom

Building H
1 Music Classroom
1 Creative Arts Classroom

Building I
2 Citizenship Classrooms

Building J
1 Music Classroom and Practice Rooms

Building K
1 Drama Classroom

On-site sports fields.

Eco-schools 
Sunbury Manor School takes part in the charitable Eco-Schools accreditation to help the school and all families connected with it reduce net impact on the environment and encourage students to take responsibility for its future. The project assessors assess the top status (Green Flag) after the school have self-assessed Silver and Bronze. The school have achieved the latter (so far) as it has:

 identified an (internal) Action Team which has met at least twice; who have
 completed an Environmental Review.
 produced a basic Action Plan and shared the plan with the rest of the school community.
 identified ways of making progress towards achieving elements of the Action Plan.
 pointed to several environmental issues covered within curriculum work.
 a designated Eco-Schools notice board, web page and newsletters page, detailing activities undertaken towards achieving the next award.

Wimbledon 
Pupils from Sunbury Manor School have been representing the school as ball boys and girls at The Championships, Wimbledon and the All England Lawn Tennis and Croquet Club for the past 10 years. From January to June pupils from year 10 attend selection trials, before undergoing rigorous training in the school and at Wimbledon. Several ball boys and girls were invited to be part of the Guard of Honour after the Men's and Ladies' Finals.

Former pupils

Sunbury County Grammar School
 Brian Capron, actor noted for Coronation Street
 Anthony Head, actor noted for Buffy the Vampire Slayer
 James Lang, professional rugby player

Sunbury Manor School
 Mike Bishay, professional Rugby player

 Kerry Norton, actress and singer

External links 
 Sunbury Manor School's website
 EduBase

References

Sunbury-on-Thames
Educational institutions established in 1956
Secondary schools in Surrey
1956 establishments in England
Academies in Surrey